Club Atlético de Madrid Femenino  (commonly known as Atlético Madrid Women or Atleti Femenino) is a Spanish women's football team based in Madrid that play in Liga F.  It is the women's section of Atlético Madrid.

History
Atlético Madrid had a women's team for the first time in the late 1980s. They won the national league in 1990 and were second the following year, but just like Atlético's handball team, they were disbanded in the early 1990s. Most players joined CD Oroquieta Villaverde, which became one of Spain's leading teams.

The team was re-established in 2001 though they did not become an official section of the club until 2005. After playing three seasons in regional leagues, between 2004 and 2006 Atlético earned two successive promotions to reach the top category. Quickly consolidating themselves in the top half of the table, they secured fourth place in 2009–10. 

On 7 October 2015, Atlético made their UEFA Women's Champions League debut. In the round of 32, they eliminated Zorky Krasnogorsk, but in the round of 16, they were swept aside by Olympique Lyon, eventual winners of the competition. On 26 June 2016, Atlético Madrid won a first major trophy after beating FC Barcelona 3–2 in the final of the Copa de la Reina.

On 20 May 2017, Atlético achieved the title after beating Real Sociedad in the last round by 2–1. The Colchoneras ended the season without losses.

In March 2019, the club broke the European record for attendance at a women's football match with 60,739 spectators at the Metropolitano Stadium for a league fixture, a 2–0 loss to FC Barcelona (beating a mark set a few months earlier by Athletic Bilbao, in a Copa de la Reina fixture against Atlético).

Competition record

Atlético Villa de Madrid

Atlético Féminas

Club Atlético Madrid

Honours

 Primera División: 4
 1989–90 (as Atlético Villa de Madrid), 2016–17, 2017–18, 2018–19
 Copa de la Reina: 1
 2015–16
 Supercopa de España: 1
 2020–21

Players

Current squad

Former players

Reserves and youth teams
In addition to the first team, seven other sub-teams are part of the club:

 Atletico Madrid Féminas 'B' that plays in the national Primera División B.
 Atletico Madrid Féminas 'C' that plays at the Madrid Preferential category, the third category of women's football at the national level.
 Atletico Madrid Féminas 'D' that plays at the Madrid Regional category, the fourth category of women's football at the national level.
 Atletico Madrid Féminas 'E' that plays at the cadet of the Community of Madrid, girls under 16 years.
 Atletico Madrid Féminas 'F' that plays at the cadet of the Community of Madrid, girls under 16 years.
 Atletico Madrid Féminas 'G' that plays at football mode 7 in the junior category of the Community of Madrid, girls under 14 years.
 Atletico Madrid Féminas 'H' that plays in football mode 7 in the junior category of the Community of Madrid, girls under 14 years.

References

External links
 At. Madrid Official website
 UEFA profile
Madrid Football Federation profile

 
Women's football clubs in Spain
Atlético Madrid
2001 establishments in Spain
Primera División (women) clubs